Hurricane Winifred was the last tropical cyclone to make landfall in the record-breaking 1992 Pacific hurricane season. Impacting western Mexico, especially Colima and Michoacán, Hurricane Winifred brought heavy rain and destruction to the area. Rains flooded farms and roads, and caused more than $5 million (1992 USD, $  USD) in damage and a total of three people were killed.

The last major hurricane, and hurricane of its season, Winifred existed in October 1992. It formed southeast of Acapulco on October 6 as the twenty-fourth east Pacific tropical cyclone of its season, and recurved as it strengthened. It peaked as a Category 3 hurricane on the Saffir-Simpson Hurricane Scale. It made landfall southeast of Manzanillo, Colima and dissipated inland.

Meteorological history

On October 1, a disorganized area of thunderstorms existed south of Panama. It gradually headed west-northwestward, slowly organized, and developed deep and concentrated convection. The disturbed area had become organized enough to be considered a tropical depression. Numbered Twenty-Four-E, the cyclone was located about 460 mi (740 km) south-southeast of Acapulco.

Winifred steadily became more organized, and late on October 7, the National Hurricane Center (NHC) was anticipating Winifred to reach hurricane intensity within the next 36 hours. A large cyclone, Winifred continued to intensify. Its forward speed decreased as it started to turn to the northwest. A small eye became evident on satellite imagery, and thus the winds increased to 85 mph (145 km/h).

Winifred then intensified into a moderate Category 2 hurricane on October 9. Although the eye briefly disappeared, slight intensification was anticipated. The hurricane was curved north by an upper-level trough. Winifred peaked in intensity as a major hurricane (Category 3 or higher on the Saffir-Simpson Scale). This made Winifred the final hurricane– major or otherwise– of the 1992 Pacific hurricane season. However, it was operationally believed to have peaked as a Category 2 hurricane; the NHC did not issue any advisories with winds any higher than 110 mph (175 km/h).

Hurricane Winifred re-curved to the north-northeast, increased in forward speed, and slightly weakened as it approached land, with the storm's eye becoming less apparent in satellite imagery. Hurricane Winifred quickly weakened after landfall, and weakened to a tropical storm less than three hours later, which was early on October 10. Later on October 10, Winifred weakened to a tropical depression, before dissipating over the mountains of central Mexico.

Preparations and impact
Five thousand people were evacuated to emergency shelters as Winifred neared. With the approach of the hurricane, watches and warnings were issued. On October 9 a tropical storm warning was issued from Zihuatanejo to Cabo Corrientes. At the same time, a hurricane watch went into effect in the same area. The watch was later replaced with a hurricane warning 12 hours later. On October 10, all watches and warnings were dropped.

Starting on October 8, Hurricane Winifred caused rainfall over an extensive area of Mexico. That rain caused flooding, which was blamed for three deaths.

Damage was heaviest in the states of Colima and Michoacán. In areas of the former, utilities were knocked out. Waves flooded portions of Highway 200 between Zihuatenajo, Ixtapa, and Lázaro Cárdenas. Other roads were also flooded. Waves of  forced the closure of Playa de Oro International Airport and port facilities in Manzanillo. Throughout the affected area, trees were blown down on cars, roughly 1,500 houses were damaged, as were hotels and restaurants. About  of farmland were damaged, especially those of plantains and corn. Carlos de la Madrid Virgen, the Governor of Colima, estimated that the total damage in his state was 16000 pesos (1992 MXP) or $5 million (1992 USD, $  USD). Elsewhere, Winifred forced a temporary closure of the port of Acapulco.

See also

 Other storms of the same name
 List of Pacific hurricanes

References

External links
 Preliminary Report

Winifred
Winifred (1992)
Hurricanes in Colima
Hurricanes in Michoacán